Paul Emanuel Polani, FRCP, HonFRCP(Ire), FRCPCH, FRCOG, HonFRCPath, DCH, FRS, (1914–2006) was an Italian-Austrian geneticist, described by the Royal College of Physicians as "one of the key figures in the development of medical genetics".

Life 
Polani was born in Trieste, on 1 January 1914, the son of the son of Elisabetta, née Zennaro, and Enrico Polani. He trained in Italy and moved to the United Kingdom to study in 1939. On the outbreak of World War II he was interned, before being released and allowed to practise as a medical officer at Evelina Children's Hospital.

From 1960 to 1982 he worked at King’s College, London and Guy's Hospital Medical School, where he was Prince Philip Professor of Paediatric Research and Director of the Paediatric Research Unit (later the Division of Genetics and Development

He was a Fellow of King's College London, and a Research Professor Emeritus at London University.

He received the Royal College of Physicians' Baly medal in 1985, and delivered the Langdon Brown memorial lecture in 1984 and the Harveian Oration in 1988.

The genetic research library at Guy's Hospital was renamed in his honour in 1982.

He was appointed a Fellow of the Royal Society (FRS) in 1973.

He died on 18 February 2006.

References

External links 

 

1914 births
2006 deaths
Place of death missing
Italian geneticists
Medical geneticists
Fellows of the Royal College of Physicians
Fellows of the Royal College of Paediatrics and Child Health
Fellows of the Royal College of Obstetricians and Gynaecologists
Fellows of the Royal Society
20th-century Italian people
Italian emigrants to the United Kingdom